Charles Walter Nichols (1875–1959), was an American industrialist who, with his father, William H. Nichols, helped organize the merger of 12 companies in 1899 to create General Chemical, which in 1921 joined four other companies to form Allied Chemical & Dye Corporation, a precursor to AlliedSignal, now owned by Honeywell as its specialty materials business. Charles Nichols, who served as a vice president and general manager at General Chemical and later Allied, also acquired the land and built what is now known at Pleasantdale Chateau in West Orange, New Jersey.

He collaborated on the Thomas Garrigue Masaryk Washington declaration in October 1918

Pleasantdale Chateau
Nichols acquired a number of contiguous farms in 1912 and created a  estate with formal gardens in West Orange. The Nichols family used the property as a summer weekend retreat and occupied a small farmhouse. But after a number of years, the family desired a larger home. In the 1920s, Nichols set out to build his country estate, preferring the Norman style of architecture from the south of England and the north of France. He hired Augustus N. Allen as his architect and the two toured Europe to seek out Norman style buildings and designed Pleasantdale Chateau. The exterior of the house, which was completed in 1933, is of the Norman half-timber and stucco character, while the interior reflects a number of period styles.

The grounds of the Chateau property were designed by renowned 20th Century landscape architect Ethelbert E. Furlong of nearby Glen Ridge, New Jersey, whose work is catalogued in the Smithsonian Institution's American Gardens collection. The land surrounding the Chateau was transformed from ordinary woodlands to rolling pastoral terrain and an intricate complex of formal gardens, only some of which has been maintained. →

The estate was acquired by Allied in 1963 to be used as a conference and training center. Pleasantdale's twenty-two bedrooms could accommodate 34 guests. It was in constant use year round, with seminars, meetings and other functions being held every day of the working week. In 1995, the Knowles family of fifth generation restaurateurs, acquired the property to continue its operation as a retreat, adding a special occasion facility for conferences and weddings.

References

Honeywell History
History of Pleasantdale Chateau

External links
Honeywell Specialty Materials
Pleasantdale Chateau

American chief executives
American chemical industry businesspeople
American chemists
Businesspeople from New Jersey
People from West Orange, New Jersey
1875 births
1959 deaths